Baotong Temple is a Buddhist temple located on the south hillside of Mount Hong, in Wuchang District of Wuhan, Hubei, China. It is one of the "Four Buddhist Temples" in Wuhan.

History

Northern and Southern dynasties
The temple was first built in the Liu Song dynasty (420–479) with the name of "Dongshan Temple" and was renamed "Mituo Temple" in the reign of Emperor Taizong of the Tang dynasty (618–907).

Song dynasty
In the Duanping period (1234–1236) of the Song dynasty (960–1279), Emperor Lizong honored the name "Chongning Wanshou Chan Temple"

Yuan dynasty
In the Yuan dynasty (1271–1368), a seven-storey Chinese pagoda was built.

Ming dynasty
In 1381, in the 14th year of Hongwu period in the Ming dynasty (1368–1644), Zhu Zhen, a son of Hongwu Emperor, restored the temple on Mount Hong. The Mahavira Hall was added in 1457 by Prince Zhu Jun'e. Baotong Temple was largely extended in 1485 and its name was changed into "Baotong Chan Temple", which is still in use now.

Qing dynasty
Baotong Temple underwent three renovations in the Qing dynasty (1644–1911), respectively in the ruling of Kangxi Emperor (1676), in the reign of Qianlong Emperor (1792) and in the Tongzhi and Guangxu periods (1865–1879). In the heyday of the temple, it had more than 1,500 monks.

Republic of China
In 1911, during the Xinhai Revolution, the revolutionary army were here to garrison. Then Cheng Qian donated property to repair the temple but it was demolished by wars soon.

In 1932, abbot Wenxian refurbished and redecorated the temple.

On November 24, 1935, the President Li Yuanhong's surpassing ceremony was held in Baotong Temple.

People's Republic of China
After the founding of the Communist State in 1952, Wuhan Municipal Government has allocated a large sum of money for constructing the temple. During the disastrous Cultural Revolution, all Buddha images were destroyed and resident monks were forcefully disrobed. A pair of exquisite stone lions from Ming dynasty were also destroyed.

Baotong Temple has been inscribed as a National Key Buddhist Temple in Han Chinese Area by the State Council of China in 1983.

In 1994, the Wuchang Buddhist College was elected in Baotong Temple.

The Mahavira Hall was completed in April 2005.

Architecture
Now the existing main buildings include Shanmen, Heavenly Kings Hall, Mahavira Hall, Hall of Guru, Free Life Pond, Jade Buddha Hall, Meditation Hall, Dharma Hall, Hall of Maitreya, Reception Hall, etc.

Hongshan Pagoda
Construction to the Hongshan Pagoda began in 1280 and were completed in 1291 during the Yuan dynasty (1271–1368), in memory of the prominent monk Lingji Ciren. It initially called "Lingji Pagoda" and renamed "Baotong Pagoda" in 1485 during the Ming dynasty (1368–1644). Because it located on Mount Hong, the pagoda is also known as the "Hongshan Pagoda". The pagoda features a facade of doors and windows, as well as columns, rafters, and brackets.

References

Bibliography
 

1952 establishments in China
20th-century Buddhist temples
Buddhist temples in Hubei
Religious buildings and structures in Wuhan
Religious buildings and structures completed in 1952